The Delaware Constitution of 1831 was the third governing document for Delaware state government and was in effect from its adoption on December 2, 1831 until replaced on June 4, 1897 by the present state Constitution.

Members of the Delaware Constitutional Convention of 1831. The Convention convened in 1831 and adjourned December 2, 1831.

Charles Polk Jr. President
Thomas Adams
John Caulk
John M. Clayton
Peter L. Cooper
Thomas Deakyne
Edward Dingle
William Dunning
John Elliott
James Fisher
Willard Hall
Thomas W. Handy
John Harlan
Charles H. Haughey
Hughitt Layton
James C. Lynch
James B. Macomb
Joseph Maull
Elias Naudain
Wiliam Nicholls
Samuel Ratcliff
John Raymond
George Read Jr.
Henry F. Rodney
James Rodgers
William Seal
Pressley Spruance, Jr.
William D. Waples

References

See also
Delaware Constitution of 1776
Delaware Constitution of 1792
Delaware Constitution of 1897, current

Constitution of 1831
Defunct state constitutions of the United States
1831 in Delaware
1831 in American law